Coralliozetus is a genus of chaenopsid blennies mostly found in the eastern Pacific Ocean with one species (C. cardonae) occurring in the western Atlantic Ocean. Additionally, one species (C. clausus) is endemic to Cocos Island, Costa Rica.

Species
There are currently seven recognized species in this genus:
 Coralliozetus angelicus (J. E. Böhlke & Mead, 1957) (Angel blenny)
 Coralliozetus boehlkei J. S. Stephens, 1963 (Barcheek blenny)
 Coralliozetus cardonae Evermann & M. C. Marsh, 1899 (Twinhorn blenny)
Coralliozetus clausus 
 Coralliozetus micropes (Beebe & Tee-Van, 1938) (Scarletfin blenny)
 Coralliozetus rosenblatti J. S. Stephens, 1963 (Spikefin blenny)
 Coralliozetus springeri J. S. Stephens & R. K. Johnson, 1966

References

 
Chaenopsidae
Taxonomy articles created by Polbot